The 2019–20 UMass Lowell River Hawks women's basketball team will represent the University of Massachusetts Lowell during the 2019–20 NCAA Division I women's basketball season. The River Hawks are led by second year head coach Tom Garrick and will once again play most their home games in the Costello Athletic Center while select games will be played in the Tsongas Center at UMass Lowell and were members of the America East Conference. They finished the season 15–14, 11–5 in America East play to finish in third place.

Media
All non-televised home games and conference road games will stream on either ESPN3 or AmericaEast.tv. Most road games will stream on the opponents website.

Roster

Schedule

|-
!colspan=9 style=| Non-conference regular season

|-
!colspan=9 style=| America East regular Season

|-
!colspan=9 style=| America East Women's Tournament

See also
 2019–20 UMass Lowell River Hawks men's basketball team

References

UMass Lowell River Hawks women's basketball seasons
UMass Lowell
UMass Lowell River Hawks women's basketball
UMass Lowell River Hawks women's basketball